Viața Liberă is a daily Romanian newspaper which began publication in December 1989 (except Sundays). It is published and sold in Galați County.

It is one of the most popular regional newspapers and has an extended audience of 159,000 daily readers. According to a different source, Viața Liberă is the second local newspaper in Romania as regards to the audience, one edition reaching an average of 116,000 readers per edition . 

Viața Liberă is owned by European Media Investment A.G.A., a German media company that currently holds the major part of over 20 companies that edit daily papers in Romania . The newspaper is published every day by "Trustul de presă Dunărea de Jos - Galați." According to BRAT, the circulation of the newspaper has dropped significantly in 2008 when an average of 10,000 copies a day were published . According to the same source the newspaper is at a record low after publishing an average of 16,000 copies a day in 1999 and 14,000 a day in 2006. 

The newspaper staff is known to have one of the most select panel of journalists, many of whom have already published successful books in Romanian, English, or French.

References

Newspapers published in Romania
Newspapers established in 1989